Andrea Scutellari or Andrea da Viadana (16th-century) was an Italian painter of the Renaissance period. He was active in Cremona and his native Viadana, working alongside his brother, Francesco. Andrea painted a Annunziata (1588) for the church of Sant'Agata, Cremona.

References

Year of birth unknown
Year of death unknown
Italian Renaissance painters
16th-century Italian painters
Italian male painters
Painters from Cremona